A net premium valuation is an actuarial calculation, used to place a value on the liabilities of a life insurer.

Background
It involves calculating a present value for the contractual liabilities of a contract, and deducting the value of future premiums. Both contractual liabilities, and future premiums in this calculation allow only for mortality and interest. The key with a net premium valuation is that the premiums being valued are theoretical measures - they make no reference to the actual premiums being charged by the insurer.

This technique is a well-established actuarial valuation method, that became popular because of its simplicity, consistency, and ease of calculation.

New methods
With the advent of computers, the more complicated so-called gross premium valuation calculation (which is also more realistic than the net premium valuation) has become much more feasible, and is displacing the archaic net premium valuation further from its historical position of prominence.

See also
Gross premiums written
 Life Assurance
 Term life insurance
 Permanent life insurance
 Whole life insurance
 Universal life insurance
 Variable universal life insurance
 Corporate-owned life insurance
 Servicemembers' Group Life Insurance
 Segregated funds
 Annuity
 Independent financial advisers
 Estate planning
 Retirement plan
 False insurance claims

Life insurance